Maharaja Institute of Technology is an engineering and management College in Arasur, Coimbatore, Tamil Nadu, India. It was established during the 2006–2007 academic year under the affiliation of Anna University owned by Thiru. K.Paramasivam, B.Sc. From 2007 onwards, they have offered a MBA course.

References

External links
 

Engineering colleges in Tamil Nadu
Colleges affiliated to Anna University
Education in Coimbatore district
Educational institutions established in 2006
2006 establishments in Tamil Nadu